Badger Girl was a ten-part educational BBC Look and Read production, which was first aired on BBC2 in 1984.

Plot
Three children are on holiday on a farm in Dartmoor. They discover two crooks who are pony-rustling, and are determined to stop them. Educational songs featured the character Stripey the 'superbadger'.

Episodes
 Sounds in the Night
 Stripey the Badger
 Running Away
 The Badgerman
 Lost on the Moor
 The Secret Passage
 Mick's Map
 Finding the Ponies
 Panic on the Lake
 Stripey the Superbadger

Further reading
 Badger Girl at Broadcast for Schools - containing airdates, summaries and full cast information

References

BBC Television